Emilio Ciolli (27 January 1933 – 23 December 2012) was an Italian racing cyclist. He rode in the 1962 Tour de France.

References

External links
 

1933 births
2012 deaths
Italian male cyclists
Place of birth missing
Sportspeople from the Metropolitan City of Florence
Cyclists from Tuscany